Tucidinostat (INN, also known as chidamide and sold under the brand names Epidaza and Hiyasta) is a histone deacetylase inhibitor (HDI) developed in China. It was also known as HBI-8000. It is a benzamide HDI and inhibits Class I HDAC1, HDAC2, HDAC3, as well as Class IIb HDAC10.

Tucidinostat is approved by the Chinese FDA for relapsed or refractory peripheral T-cell lymphoma (PTCL) and has orphan drug status in Japan. In Japan, it was approved for relapsed or refractory adult T-cell leukemia-lymphoma (ATLL) treatment in June 2021.

Tucidinostat is being researched as a treatment for pancreatic cancer. However, it is not US FDA approved for the treatment of pancreatic cancer.

References 

Histone deacetylase inhibitors
3-Pyridyl compounds
Benzamides
Anilides
Fluoroarenes